Thomas Stephen Szasz (15 April 1920 – 8 September 2012) was a Hungarian-American academic and psychiatrist. He served for most of his career as professor of psychiatry at the State University of New York Upstate Medical University in Syracuse, New York. A distinguished lifetime fellow of the American Psychiatric Association and a life member of the American Psychoanalytic Association, he was best known as a social critic of the moral and scientific foundations of psychiatry, as what he saw as the social control aims of medicine in modern society, as well as scientism. His books The Myth of Mental Illness (1961) and The Manufacture of Madness (1970) set out some of the arguments most associated with him.

Szasz argued throughout his career that mental illness is a metaphor for human problems in living, and that mental illnesses are not "illnesses" in the sense that physical illnesses are, and that except for a few identifiable brain diseases, there are "neither biological or chemical tests nor biopsy or necropsy findings for verifying DSM diagnoses."

Szasz maintained throughout his career that he was not anti-psychiatry but rather that he opposed coercive psychiatry. He was a staunch opponent of civil commitment and involuntary psychiatric treatment, but he believed in and practiced psychiatry and psychotherapy between consenting adults.

Life
Szasz was born to Jewish parents Gyula and Lily Szász on April 15, 1920, in Budapest, Hungary. In 1938, Szasz moved to the United States, where he attended the University of Cincinnati for his Bachelor of Science in physics, and received his M.D. from the same university in 1944. Szasz completed his residency requirement at the Cincinnati General Hospital, then worked at the Chicago Institute for Psychoanalysis from 1951–56, and then for the next five years was a member of its staff – taking 24 months out for duty with the U.S. Naval Reserve.

In 1962, Szasz received a tenured position in medicine at the State University of New York. Szasz had first joined SUNY in 1956.

Szasz had two daughters. His wife, Rosine, died in 1971. Szasz's colleague Jeff Schaler described her death as a suicide.

Szasz's views of psychiatry were influenced by the writings of Frigyes Karinthy.

Death 
Thomas Szasz ended his own life on September 8, 2012. He had previously suffered a fall and would have had to live in chronic pain otherwise. Szasz argued for the right to suicide in his writings.

Rise of Szasz's arguments
Szasz first presented his attack on "mental illness" as a legal term in 1958 in the Columbia Law Review. In his article he argued that mental illness was no more a fact bearing on a suspect's guilt than is possession by the devil.

In 1961, Szasz testified before a United States Senate Committee, arguing that using mental hospitals to incarcerate people defined as insane violated the general assumptions of the patient-doctor relationship, and turned the doctor into a warden and keeper of a prison.

Szasz's main arguments
Szasz was convinced there was a metaphorical character to mental disorders, and its uses in psychiatry were frequently injurious. He set himself a task to delegitimize legitimating agencies and authorities, and what he saw as their vast powers, enforced by psychiatrists and other mental health professionals, mental health laws, mental health courts, and mental health sentences.

Szasz was a critic of the influence of modern medicine on society, which he considered to be the secularization of religion's hold on humankind. Criticizing scientism, he targeted psychiatry in particular, underscoring its campaigns against masturbation at the end of the 19th century, its use of medical imagery and language to describe misbehavior, its reliance on involuntary mental hospitalization to protect society, and the use of lobotomy and other interventions to treat psychosis. To sum up his description of the political influence of medicine in modern societies imbued by faith in science, he declared:
Since theocracy is the rule of God or its priests, and democracy the rule of the people or of the majority, pharmacracy is therefore the rule of medicine or of doctors.

Szasz consistently paid attention to the power of language in the establishment and maintenance of the social order, both in small interpersonal and in wider social, economic, and/or political spheres:
The struggle for definition is veritably the struggle for life itself. In the typical Western two men fight desperately for the possession of a gun that has been thrown to the ground: whoever reaches the weapon first shoots and lives; his adversary is shot and dies. In ordinary life, the struggle is not for guns but for words; whoever first defines the situation is the victor; his adversary, the victim. For example, in the family, husband and wife, mother and child do not get along; who defines whom as troublesome or mentally sick?... [the one] who first seizes the word imposes reality on the other; [the one] who defines thus dominates and lives; and [the one] who is defined is subjugated and may be killed.
His main arguments can be summarized as follows:

"Myth of mental illness"
"Mental illness" is an expression, a metaphor that describes an offending, disturbing, shocking, or vexing conduct, action, or pattern of behavior, such as packaged under the wide-ranging term schizophrenia, as an "illness" or "disease". Szasz wrote: "If you talk to God, you are praying; If God talks to you, you have schizophrenia. If the dead talk to you, you are a spiritualist; If you talk to the dead, you are a schizophrenic." He maintained that, while people behave and think in disturbing ways, and those ways may resemble a disease process (pain, deterioration, response to various interventions), this does not mean they actually have a disease. To Szasz, disease can only mean something people "have", while behavior is what people "do". Diseases are "malfunctions of the human body, of the heart, the liver, the kidney, the brain" while "no behavior or misbehavior is a disease or can be a disease. That's not what diseases are." Szasz cited drapetomania as an example of a behavior that many in society did not approve of, being labeled and widely cited as a disease. Likewise, women who did not bend to a man's will were said to have hysteria. He thought that psychiatry actively obscures the difference between behavior and disease in its quest to help or harm parties in conflicts. He maintained that, by calling people diseased, psychiatry attempts to deny them responsibility as moral agents in order to better control them.

In Szasz's view, people who are said by themselves or others to have a mental illness can only have, at best, "problems in living". Diagnoses of "mental illness" or "mental disorder" (the latter expression called by Szasz a "weasel term" for mental illness) are passed off as "scientific categories" but they remain merely judgments (judgments of disdain) to support certain uses of power by psychiatric authorities. In that line of thinking, schizophrenia becomes not the name of a disease entity but a judgment of extreme psychiatric and social disapprobation. Szasz called schizophrenia "the sacred symbol of psychiatry" because those so labeled have long provided and continue to provide justification for psychiatric theories, treatments, abuses, and reforms.

The figure of the psychotic or schizophrenic person to psychiatric experts and authorities, according to Szasz, is analogous with the figure of the heretic or blasphemer to theological experts and authorities. According to Szasz, to understand the metaphorical nature of the term "disease" in psychiatry, one must first understand its literal meaning in the rest of medicine. To be a true disease, the entity must first somehow be capable of being approached, measured, or tested in scientific fashion. Second, to be confirmed as a disease, a condition must demonstrate pathology at the cellular or molecular level.

A genuine disease must also be found on the autopsy table (not merely in the living person) and meet pathological definition instead of being voted into existence by members of the American Psychiatric Association. "Mental illnesses" are really problems in living. They are often "like a" disease, argued Szasz, which makes the medical metaphor understandable, but in no way validates it as an accurate description or explanation. Psychiatry is a pseudoscience that parodies medicine by using medical-sounding words invented especially over the last one hundred years. To be clear, heart break and heart attack, or spring fever and typhoid fever belong to two completely different logical categories, and treating one as the other constitutes a category error. Psychiatrists are the successors of "soul doctors", priests who dealt and deal with the spiritual conundrums, dilemmas, and vexations – the "problems in living" – that have troubled people forever.

Psychiatry's main methods are assessment, medication, conversation or rhetoric and incarceration. To the extent that psychiatry presents these problems as "medical diseases", its methods as "medical treatments", and its clients – especially involuntary – as medically ill patients, it embodies a lie and therefore constitutes a fundamental threat to freedom and dignity. Psychiatry, supported by the state through various Mental Health Acts, has become a modern secular state religion according to Szasz. It is a vastly elaborate social control system, using both brute force and subtle indoctrination, which disguises itself under the claims of being rational, systematic and therefore scientific.

"Patient" as malingerer
According to Szasz, many people fake their presentation of mental illness, i.e., they are malingering. They do so for gain, for example, in order to escape a burden like evading the draft, or to gain access to drugs or financial support, or for some other personally meaningful reason. By definition, the malingerer is knowingly deceitful (although malingering itself has also been called a mental illness or disorder). Szasz mentions malingering in many of his works, but it is not what he has in mind to explain many other manifestations of so-called "mental illness". In those cases, so-called "patients" have something personally significant to communicate – their "problems in living" – but unable to express this via conventional means they resort to illness-imitation behaviour, a somatic protolanguage or "body language", which psychiatrists and psychologists have misguidedly interpreted as the signs/symptoms of real illness. So, for example, "analyzing the origin of the hysterical protolanguage Szasz states that it has a double origin: – the first root is in the somatic structure of human being. The human body is subject to illnesses and disabilities expressed through somatic signs (like paralysis, convulsions, etc.) and somatic sensations (like pain, tiredness, etc.); – the second root can be found into cultural factors."

Separation of psychiatry and the state
Szasz believed that if we accept that "mental illness" is a euphemism for behaviors that are disapproved of, then the state has no right to force psychiatric "treatment" on these individuals. Similarly, the state should not be able to interfere in mental health practices between consenting adults (for example, by legally controlling the supply of psychotropic drugs or psychiatric medication). The medicalization of government produces a "therapeutic state", designating someone as, for example, "insane" or as a "drug addict".

In Ceremonial Chemistry (1973), he argued that the same persecution that targeted witches, Jews, gypsies, and homosexuals now targets "drug addicts" and "insane" people. Szasz argued that all these categories of people were taken as scapegoats of the community in ritual ceremonies. To underscore this continuation of religion through medicine, he even takes as an example obesity: instead of concentrating on junk food (ill-nutrition), physicians denounced hypernutrition. According to Szasz, despite their scientific appearance, the diets imposed were a moral substitute to the former fasts, and the social injunction not to be overweight is to be considered as a moral order, not as a scientific advice as it claims to be. As with those thought bad (insane people), and those who took the wrong drugs (drug addicts), medicine created a category for those who had the wrong weight (obesity).

Szasz argued that psychiatrics were created in the 17th century to study and control those who erred from the medical norms of social behavior; a new specialization, drogophobia, was created in the 20th century to study and control those who erred from the medical norms of drug consumption; and then, in the 1960s, another specialization, bariatrics (from the Greek βάρος baros, for "weight"), was created to deal with those who erred from the medical norms concerning the weight the body should have. Thus, he underscores that in 1970, the American Society of Bariatric Physicians had 30 members, and already 450 two years later.

Presumption of competence and death control
Just as legal systems work on the presumption that a person is innocent until proven guilty, individuals accused of crimes should not be presumed incompetent simply because a doctor or psychiatrist labels them as such. Mental incompetence should be assessed like any other form of incompetence, i.e., by purely legal and judicial means with the right of representation and appeal by the accused.

In an analogy to birth control, Szasz argued that individuals should be able to choose when to die without interference from medicine or the state, just as they are able to choose when to conceive without outside interference. He considered suicide to be among the most fundamental rights, but he opposed state-sanctioned euthanasia.

In his 2006 book about Virginia Woolf he stated that she put an end to her life by a conscious and deliberate act, her suicide being an expression of her freedom of choice.

Abolition of the insanity defense and involuntary hospitalization
Szasz believed that testimony about the mental competence of a defendant should not be admissible in trials. Psychiatrists testifying about the mental state of an accused person's mind have about as much business as a priest testifying about the religious state of a person's soul in our courts. Insanity was a legal tactic invented to circumvent the punishments of the Church, which at the time included confiscation of the property of those who committed suicide, often leaving widows and orphans destitute. Only an insane person would do such a thing to his widow and children, it was successfully argued. This is legal mercy masquerading as medicine, according to Szasz.

No one should be deprived of liberty unless he is found guilty of a criminal offense. Depriving a person of liberty for what is said to be his own good is immoral. Just as a person suffering from terminal cancer may refuse treatment, so should a person be able to refuse psychiatric treatment.

The right to drugs
Drug addiction is not a "disease" to be cured through legal drugs but a social habit. Szasz also argues in favor of a free market for drugs. He criticized the war on drugs, arguing that using drugs is in fact a victimless crime. Prohibition itself constituted the crime. He argued that the war on drugs leads states to do things that would have never been considered half a century before, such as prohibiting a person from ingesting certain substances or interfering in other countries to impede the production of certain plants, e.g. coca eradication plans, or the campaigns against opium; both are traditional plants opposed by the Western world. Although Szasz was skeptical about the merits of psychotropic medications, he favored the repeal of drug prohibition.

Szasz also drew analogies between the persecution of the drug-using minority and the persecution of Jewish and homosexual minorities.The Nazis spoke of having a "Jewish problem". We now speak of having a drug-abuse problem. Actually, "Jewish problem" was the name the Germans gave to their persecution of the Jews; "drug-abuse problem" is the name we give to the persecution of people who use certain drugs.Szasz cites former U.S. Representative James M. Hanley's reference to drug users as "vermin", using "the same metaphor for condemning persons who use or sell illegal drugs that the Nazis used to justify murdering Jews by poison gas – namely, that the persecuted persons are not human beings, but 'vermin.'"

Therapeutic state
The "therapeutic state" is a phrase coined by Szasz in 1963. The collaboration between psychiatry and government leads to what Szasz calls the therapeutic state, a system in which disapproved actions, thoughts, and emotions are repressed ("cured") through pseudomedical interventions. Thus suicide, unconventional religious beliefs, racial bigotry, unhappiness, anxiety, shyness, sexual promiscuity, shoplifting, gambling, overeating, smoking, and illegal drug use are all considered symptoms or illnesses that need to be cured. When faced with demands for measures to curtail smoking in public, binge-drinking, gambling or obesity, ministers say that "we must guard against charges of nanny statism." The "nanny state" has turned into the "therapeutic state" where nanny has given way to counselor. Nanny just told people what to do; counselors also tell them what to think and what to feel. The "nanny state" was punitive, austere, and authoritarian, the therapeutic state is touchy-feely, supportive – and even more authoritarian.

According to Szasz, "the therapeutic state swallows up everything human on the seemingly rational ground that nothing falls outside the province of health and medicine, just as the theological state had swallowed up everything human on the perfectly rational ground that nothing falls outside the province of God and religion." Faced with the problem of "madness", Western individualism proved to be ill-prepared to defend the rights of the individual: modern man has no more right to be a madman than medieval man had a right to be a heretic because if once people agree that they have identified the one true God, or Good, it brings about that they have to guard members and nonmembers of the group from the temptation to worship false gods or goods. A secularization of God and the medicalization of good resulted in the post-Enlightenment version of this view: once people agree that they have identified the one true reason, it brings about that they have to guard against the temptation to worship unreason – that is, madness.

Civil libertarians warn that the marriage of the state with psychiatry could have catastrophic consequences for civilization. In the same vein as the separation of church and state, Szasz believes that a solid wall must exist between psychiatry and the state.

American Association for the Abolition of Involuntary Mental Hospitalization
Believing that psychiatric hospitals are like prisons not hospitals and that psychiatrists who subject others to coercion function as judges and jailers not physicians, Szasz made efforts to abolish involuntary psychiatric hospitalization for over two decades, and in 1970 took a part in founding the American Association for the Abolition of Involuntary Mental Hospitalization (AAAIMH). Its founding was announced by Szasz in 1971 in the American Journal of Psychiatry and American Journal of Public Health. The association provided legal help to psychiatric patients and published a journal, The Abolitionist.

Relationship to Citizens Commission on Human Rights
In 1969, Szasz and the Church of Scientology co-founded the Citizens Commission on Human Rights (CCHR) to oppose involuntary psychiatric treatments. Szasz served on CCHR's Board of Advisors as Founding Commissioner. In the keynote address at the 25th anniversary of CCHR, Szasz stated, "We should all honor CCHR because it is really the organization that for the first time in human history has organized a politically, socially, internationally significant voice to combat psychiatry. This has never been done in human history before."

In a 2009 interview aired by the Australian Broadcasting Corporation, Szasz explained his reason for collaborating with CCHR and lack of involvement with Scientology:

Well I got affiliated with an organisation long after I was established as a critic of psychiatry, called Citizens Commission for Human Rights, because they were then the only organisation and they still are the only organisation who had money and had some access to lawyers and were active in trying to free mental patients who were incarcerated in mental hospitals with whom there was nothing wrong, who had committed no crimes, who wanted to get out of the hospital. And that to me was a very worthwhile cause; it's still a very worthwhile cause. I no more believe in their religion or their beliefs than I believe in the beliefs of any other religion. I am an atheist, I don't believe in Christianity, in Judaism, in Islam, in Buddhism and I don't believe in Scientology. I have nothing to do with Scientology.

Russell Tribunal
In the summer of 2001, Szasz took part in a Russell Tribunal on human rights in psychiatry held in Berlin between June 30 and July 2, 2001. The tribunal brought in the two following verdicts: the majority verdict claimed that there was "serious abuse of human rights in psychiatry" and that psychiatry was "guilty of the combination of force and unaccountability"; the minority verdict, signed by the Israeli Law Professor Alon Harel and Brazilian novelist Paulo Coelho, called for "public critical examination of the role of psychiatry".

Responses and reactions
Szasz was a strong critic of institutional psychiatry and his publications were very widely read. He argued that so-called mental illnesses had no underlying physiological basis, but were unwanted and unpleasant behaviors. Mental illness, he said, was only a metaphor that described problems that people faced in their daily lives, labeled as if they were medical diseases. Szasz's ideas had little influence on mainstream psychiatry, but were supported by some behavioral and social scientists. Sociologist Erving Goffman, who wrote Asylums: Essays on the Condition of the Social Situation of Mental Patients and Other Inmates, was skeptical about psychiatric practices. He was concerned that the stigma and social rejection associated with psychiatric treatment might harm people. Thomas Scheff, also a sociologist, had similar reservations.

Kendell's views
Robert Evan Kendell presents (in Schaler, 2005) a critique of Szasz's conception of disease and the contention that mental illness is "mythical" as presented in The Myth of Mental Illness. Kendell's arguments include the following:

 Szasz's conception of disease exclusively in terms of "lesion", i.e. morphological abnormality, is arbitrary and his conclusions based on this idea represent special pleading. There are non-psychiatric conditions that remain defined solely in terms of syndrome, e.g. migraine, torticollis, essential tremor, blepharospasm, torsion dystonia. Szasz's scepticism regarding syndromally defined diseases – only in relation to psychiatry – is entirely arbitrary. Many diseases that are outside the purview of psychiatry are defined purely in terms of the constellation of the symptoms, signs and natural history they present yet Szasz has not expressed any doubt regarding their existence. Is syndrome-based diagnosis only problematic for psychiatry but without issue for the remaining branches of medicine? If syndrome-based diagnosis is unsound on account of its absence of objectivity then it must be generally unsound and not only for psychiatry.
 Szasz's ostensibly exclusive criterion of disease as morphological abnormality – i.e., a lesion made evident "by post-mortem examination of organs and tissues" – is unsound because it inadvertently includes many conditions that are not considered to be diseases by virtue of the fact that they don't produce suffering or disability, e.g., functionally inconsequential chromosomal translocations and deletions, fused second and third toes, dextrocardia. Szasz's conception of disease does not distinguish between necessary versus sufficient conditions in relation to diagnostic criteria. In branches of medicine other than psychiatry, morphological abnormality per se is not considered sufficient cause to make a diagnosis of disease; functional abnormality is the necessary condition.
 Szasz's criticism of syndrome-based diagnoses is divorced from a consideration of the history of medicine. In medicine (in general) diseases are defined in terms of a multitude of criteria, these include: (a) morbid anatomy, e.g., mitral stenosis, cholecystitis; (b) histologically, e.g., most cancers, Alzheimer's disease; (c) infective organism, e.g. Tuberculosis, Measles; (d) physiologically, e.g. myasthenia gravis; (e) biochemically, e.g. aminoaciduria; (e) chromosomally, e.g. trisomy 21, Turner's syndrome; (f) molecularly, e.g. thalassemia; (g) genetically, e.g. Huntington's disease, cystic fibrosis; and (h) syndrome, e.g. migraine, torticollis, essential tremor, blepharospasm, torsion dystonia and most (so-called) mental disorders. The more objective definitions of disease – specified as (a) through (g) – became possible through the accumulation of scientific knowledge and the development of relevant technology. Initially the underlying pathology of some diseases was unknown and they were diagnosed only in terms of syndrome – no lesion could be demonstrated "by post-mortem examination of organs and tissues" (as Szasz requires) until later in history, e.g. malaria was diagnosed solely on the basis of syndrome until the advent of microbiology. A strict application of Szasz's criterion necessitates the conclusion that diseases such as malaria were "mythical" until medical microbiology arrived, at which point they became "real". In this regard Szasz's criterion of disease is unsound by virtue of its contradictory results.
 Szasz's contention that mental illness is not associated with any morphological abnormality is uninformed by genetics, biochemistry, and current research results on the etiology of mental illness. Genes are essentially instructions for the synthesis of proteins. Hence, any condition that is even partly hereditary necessarily manifests structural abnormality at the molecular level. Regardless of whether the actual morphological abnormality can be identified, if a condition has a hereditary component then it has a biological basis. Twin and adoption studies have strongly demonstrated that heredity is a major factor in the etiology of schizophrenia; thus there must be some biological difference between schizophrenics and non-schizophrenics. In relation to major depressive disorder a difference of response between euthymic and depressed individuals to antidepressant drugs and to tryptophan depletion has been demonstrated. These results in addition to twin and adoption studies provide evidence of an underlying molecular – hence structural – abnormality to depression.
 Szasz contends that, "Strictly speaking, disease or illness can affect only the body; hence, there can be no mental illness" and this idea is foundational to Szasz's position. In actuality, there are no physical or mental illnesses per se; there are only diseases of organisms, of persons. The bifurcation of organisms into minds and bodies is the product of the Cartesian dualism that became dominant in the late 18th century and it was at this time that the notion of insanity as something qualitatively different from other illnesses became entrenched. In actuality, brain and body comprise one integrated and indivisible system and no illness "respects" the abstraction of mind vs. body upon which Szasz's argument rests. There are no illnesses that are purely mental or purely physical. Somatic pain is itself a mental phenomenon as is the subjective distress produced by the acute phase response at the onset of illness or immediately after trauma. Similarly, conditions such as schizophrenia and major depressive disorder produce somatic symptoms. Any illness lies somewhere within a continuum between the poles of mind and body; the extrema are purely theoretical abstractions and are unoccupied by any real affliction. The mind/body division persists purely for pragmatic reasons and forms no real part of modern biomedical science.

Shorter's views
Shorter replied to Szasz's essay "The myth of mental illness: 50 years later", which was published in the journal The Psychiatrist (and delivered as a plenary address at the International Congress of the Royal College of Psychiatrists in Edinburgh on 24 June 2010) – in recognition of the 50th anniversary of The Myth of Mental Illness – with the following principal criticisms:
 Szasz's critique is implicitly premised on a conception of mind drawn from the psychiatry of the early-mid 20th century – namely psychoanalytic psychiatry – and Szasz has not updated his critique in light of later developments in psychiatry. The referent of Szasz's critique – Freud's mind – is to be found only in the historical record and some isolated islands of psychoanalytic practice. To this extent, Szasz's critique does not address contemporary biologically-oriented psychiatry and is irrelevant. Certainly the phrase mental illness occurs in the contemporary psychiatric lexicon, but that is merely a legacy of the earlier psychoanalytic influence upon psychiatry; the term does not reflect a real belief that psychiatric disease – Shorter's preferred term – originates in the mind, an abstraction as Szasz rightly explains.
 Szasz concedes that some so-called mental illnesses may have a neurological basis – but adds that were such a biological basis discovered for these so-called mental illnesses, they would have to be reclassified from mental illnesses to brain diseases, which would vindicate his position. Shorter explains that the problem with Szasz's argument here is that it is the contention of biological psychiatry that so-called mental illnesses are actually brain diseases. Modern psychiatry has de facto dispensed with the idea of mental illness, i.e. the notion that psychiatric disease is mainly or entirely psychogenic is not a part of biological psychiatry.
 There exists at least prima facie evidence that psychiatric illness has a biological basis and Szasz either ignores this evidence or attempts to insulate his argument from such evidence by effectively claiming that "no true mental illness has a biological basis." Shorter cites hypothalamic–pituitary–adrenal axis (HPA) dysregulation, a positive dexamethasone suppression test result, and shortened rapid eye movement sleep latency in those with melancholic depression as examples of this evidence. Further examples cited by Shorter include the responsiveness of catatonia to barbiturates and benzodiazepines.

Awards
Szasz was honored with over fifty awards including:
 American Humanist Association named him Humanist of the Year (1973)
 Award for Greatest Public Service Benefiting the Disadvantaged, an award given out annually by Jefferson Awards (1974)
 Martin Buber Award (1974)
 He was honored with an honorary doctorate in behavioral science at Universidad Francisco Marroquín (1979)
 Humanist Laureate Award (1995)
 Great Lake Association of Clinical Medicine Patients' Rights Advocate Award (1995)
 American Psychological Association Rollo May Award (1998)

Thomas S. Szasz Award
The Center for Independent Thought established the Thomas S. Szasz Award for Outstanding Contributions to the Cause of Civil Liberties.

Notable recipients
Giorgio Antonucci
Vladimir Bukovsky
Henry Zvi Lothane
Jeffrey Schaler
Edward Snowden
Jacob Sullum
Phil Zimmermann
Richard E. Vatz

See also 
 Wrongful involuntary commitment

Writings

Books
 
 
 
 
 
 
 
 
 
 
 
  (First published in 1976 under the name: Karl Kraus and the Soul-Doctors: A Pioneer Critic and His Criticism of Psychiatry and Psychoanalysis – Louisiana State University Press, 1976.)

Selected scholarly papers

References

Further reading
 
 
 
 
 
  The book in full is available online by click

External links

 Bibliography of Szasz's writings.
 Thomas Szasz Papers at Syracuse University
 The Thomas S. Szasz Cybercenter for Liberty and Responsibility
 Concepts and Controversies in Modern Medicine: Psychiatry and Law: How are They Related? pt. 1 Video discussion of forensic psychiatry by Szasz and Bernard Diamond.
 Concepts and Controversies in Modern Medicine: Psychiatry and Law: How are They Related? pt. 2

1920 births
2012 deaths
Activists from Syracuse, New York
Jewish American atheists
American human rights activists
American humanists
American libertarians
American people of Hungarian-Jewish descent
American psychiatrists
American psychoanalysts
Anti-psychiatry
History of psychiatry
Hungarian emigrants to the United States
Hungarian Jews
Hungarian libertarians
Jewish American writers
Jewish psychoanalysts
People from Manlius, New York
Psychiatry academics
Scientology and psychiatry
Soviet psychiatric abuse whistleblowers
State University of New York faculty
State University of New York Upstate Medical University faculty
Theorists in psychiatry
University of Cincinnati alumni
Writers from Budapest
2012 suicides
Suicides in New York (state)
Member of the Mont Pelerin Society